Guo Zhengtang (born April 8, 1964) is a Chinese geologist specialized in the Cenozoic.

Education and early life
Guo was born in Shuozhou, Shanxi Province in 1964. He received his Bachelor of Arts degree in Geology from Peking University in 1983, and earned Ph.D. of soil science from the Pierre and Marie Curie University, France in 1990.

Research and career
Guo's research mainly focuses on the eolian sediments of the Chinese Loess Plateau and ancient climate change. He was the Director-general of the Institute of Earth Environment, Chinese Academy of Sciences during 2002-2006. He was a Vice-President of the INQUA Commission on Paleoclimates. He and his colleagues extended the loess records in China from ~8 Ma to ~22 Ma.

References 

1964 births
Living people
Chinese geologists
Members of the Chinese Academy of Sciences
Peking University alumni
People from Shuozhou
Scientists from Shanxi